Castledine is a surname, and may refer to

 Annie Castledine (1939–2016), British theatre director, teacher and dramaturg
 Fred Castledine (1937–2019), Australian rules football player
 Gary Castledine (born 1970), Scottish former footballer
 George Castledine (died 2018), British nursing educator and nursing consultant
 Stafford Castledine (1912–1986), English cricketer
 Stewart Castledine (born 1973), English former footballer

English-language surnames